Gidi (Gideon) Grinstein is an Israeli societal entrepreneur. He is the founder of the Reut Group (formerly the Reut Institute),  a non-partisan not-for-profit research, strategy and leadership group. He helped to found TOM: Tikkun Olam Makers,  a global nonprofit that aids the disabled, elderly and poor. In December 2017, Forbes named TOM one of fifteen technology companies to watch in 2018 (here). Grinstein is the author of Flexigidity: The Secret of Jewish Adaptability and the Challenge and Opportunity Facing Israel.

Grinstein served as Secretary and Coordinator of the Israeli delegation for the negotiations with the PLO in 1999–2001. He was on the team that  established Taglit-Birthright Israel, and is the co-author of the ISRAEL 15 Vision, plan for Israel's long-term economic development.

Biography
Gidi Grinstein was born in 1970 in Israel and grew up in Israel, Ivory Coast and the Cameroon. He graduated Ayalon High School and Tel-Aviv University Schools of Economics (1991) and Law (1999). He is a captain (Res.) in the Israeli Navy (1991-1995). In 2002, he graduated the Harvard Kennedy School of Government with an MPA.

In 2015 Gidi relocated to New York City, and became President of Reut USA.

He is married and the father of five.

Organizations and initiatives founded 

 Reut Group (formerly the Reut Institute)
 Israel 15 Vision: Leapfrogging the Periphery for Israel's long-term prosperity.
 XLN: A network of 3D printer maker spaces
 TOM: Tikkun Olam Makers,  a global nonprofit that aids the disabled, elderly and poor.

Strategic planning career
Following his military service, Gidi worked with the Economic Cooperation Foundation, where he coordinated and led projects on economic cooperation among Israel, the Palestinians and Jordan (1995-1997) and then a policy-planning effort on Israeli-Palestinian peace negotiations. During that period he also founded and led the Israeli team that designed the Birthright Israel program, based on the ideas of Yossi Beilin.

In 1999-2001 Gidi served as the Secretary and Coordinator of the Israeli Delegation for the Negotiations with the PLO in the Office and then in the Bureau of the Prime Minister of Israel, Ehud Barak. He was the youngest participant at the Camp David Summit in July 2000.

In the summer of 2002, Grinstein  established Reut Institute. Key milestones include the launch and leadership of the ISRAEL 15 Vision; multiple efforts on Israel's relations with World Jewry; the effort against antisemitism and the de-legitimization of Israel; and the work on civil resilience in times of crisis.

In 2012, Reut published a strategic framework called 21st Century Tikkun Olam, calling upon the State of Israel and the Jewish People to improve the lives of 250,000,000 within a decade. The work of the Reut Group was expanded to include innovation in design and technology to address neglected needs in society. Within this framework, he led the launch of XLN (2011-2018), of Impact Labs in partnership with WeWork (in 2017) and TOM: Tikkun Olam Makers (in 2014).

Public service career
Gidi Grinstein served in the Government of Israel between 1999 and 2001 as Secretary and Coordinator of the Israeli negotiation team on the Permanent Status Agreement between Israel and the Palestine Liberation Organization in the Office and later in the Bureau of Prime Minister Ehud Barak (1999–2001). He was the youngest member of the Israel delegation at the time.  On the night of July 17–18, 2000, at the 2000 Camp David Summit, he used the Heimlich maneuver to dislodge a peanut from Barak's throat.

In addition to the Reut Group, he founded Yesodot Group for reforming Israeli Governance; was a member of Kol Dor Group for global Jewish peoplehood; a member of "Israel 2025 – Scenarios for Future Developments"; and a founding member of a group that put together the "Birthright Israel" program.

Published works
In 2013, Grinstein published  "Flexigidity: The Secret of Jewish Adaptability & Challenge and Opportunity Facing Israel."

References

External links
 Reut Institute Founder Gidi Grinstein: Realigning Israel’s Presence in the World, by the University of Pennsylvania 
 “Flexigidity” and the Jewish People on Schusterman
Time for a Revolution in Israel's Global Engagement, Fathom: For a deeper understanding of Israel, 2 June 2014

Year of birth missing (living people)
Living people
Israeli activists
Israeli military personnel
Tel Aviv University alumni
Harvard Kennedy School alumni